Claude Vasconi (24 June 1940 - 8 December 2009) was a French architect.

Vasconi was born in Rosheim, and was educated at the Ecole Nationale Supérieure des Arts et de l'Industrie in Strasbourg. In 1964, he set up office in Paris. After designing two key projects as a young architect, Forum des Halles in the centre of Paris and the building of the Préfecture in Cergy-Pontoise, he became one of the most sought-after architects in France, with major projects in Montpellier, Strasbourg and Saint-Nazaire.  He died in Paris, aged 69.

Claude Vasconi has been credited as the pioneer proponent of the concept of "Angelina"-style cellular steel beams.

Selected works
 2008 Library in Genk, Belgium
 2007 Nouvel Hôpital Civil (hospital) in Strasbourg
 2002 Palais de Justice (courthouse) in Grenoble
 2002 L'Onde Cultural Centre in Vélizy-Villacoublay
 2001 Grand Bateau office building in Düsseldorf, Germany
 1995-1998 Grand Ballon observatory, on top of the Grand Ballon, the highest point of the Vosges mountains
 1995 Tower above the Lille Europe train station, Euralille, Lille
 1994-1999 Refurbishment of the Borsig Halle, a former locomotive factory in Berlin, Germany
 1990-1994 Congress Centre in Reims
 1989 Building of the Bas-Rhin département in Strasbourg
 1989 Thomson factory in Valenciennes
 1988-1993 Cultural Centre La Filature in Mulhouse
 1988 The Corum complex in Montpellier
 1987-1989 Shopping Mall Le Paquebot in Saint-Nazaire
 1984 TDF Tower in Romainville
 1979 Renault factory in Boulogne-Billancourt
 1979 Forum des Halles with Georges Pencreac'h.

References

External links
 Homepage of Vasconi's firm
 Structurae page on Vasconi

1940 births
2009 deaths
People from Rosheim
20th-century French architects